The Harassed Hero is a 1954 British comedy film directed by Maurice Elvey and starring Guy Middleton, Joan Winmill Brown and Elwyn Brook-Jones. It was based on a novel of the same name by Ernest Dudley. The film was produced as a second feature and shot at Walton Studios and on location in London. The film's sets were designed by the art director John Stoll.

Plot
Wealthy hypochondriac bachelor Murray Selwyn (Guy Middleton) has been ordered by his doctors to avoid stress, but unfortunately finds himself face to face with a gang of counterfeiters. Murray has unwittingly come into possession of the printing plates the gang is after. His stress levels escalate further when Murray's nurse (Joan Winmill Brown) is kidnapped by the gang.

Cast
 Guy Middleton as Murray Selwyn
 Joan Winmill Brown as Nurse Brooks
 Elwyn Brook-Jones as Logan
 Mary Mackenzie as Estelle Logan
 Harold Goodwin as Twigg
 Joss Ambler as Dr. Grice
 Clive Morton as Archer
 Hugh Moxey as Willis
 Stafford Byrne
 Gabrielle Brune
Gaylord Cavallaro
 Simone Lovell
 Alfred Maron

Critical reception
TV Guide wrote, "silly comedy routines abound in this patented British farce."

References

Bibliography
 Chibnall, Steve & McFarlane, Brian. The British 'B' Film. Palgrave MacMillan, 2009.

External links

1954 films
1954 comedy films
1950s English-language films
Films directed by Maurice Elvey
British comedy films
Films set in London
Films shot in London
Films shot at Nettlefold Studios
British black-and-white films
1950s British films